Vahagni (also romanized as Vaagni; formerly, Шагали [Shagali]) is a village in the Lori Province of Armenia.

Development Programs 
In 2015 some programs started to be implemented in Vahagni by Children of Armenia Fund.

Women Health Screenings, Support for Reproductive Health were implemented in the village by COAF.

In September 2021 the first international Youth Exchange took place in the village of Vahagni, the project was promoted by the European Community through the Erasmus+ funds. Italy, Armenia, Georgia, Denmark and Ukraine participated in the exchange.

See also 

 Lori province
 Children of Armenia Fund

References 

 
 World Gazeteer: Armenia – World-Gazetteer.com

Populated places in Lori Province